The Lake Highway, or A5, is a main highway and A-road in Tasmania. Although still known as the Lake Highway the official title of the road was changed in 2001 to Highland Lakes Road.

The Lake Highway branches off the Midland Highway at Melton Mowbray in southern Tasmania and continues for 152 kilometres, with Bothwell being the main town of any size en route, terminating in Deloraine.  Until recently it was the only major A-road in Australia that was partially unsealed; works to seal the road were completed in April 2019. The highway is one of the least used in Tasmania, except during the summer months when the road is used by Great Lake commuters.  The portion of the highway on and near the Great Lake in Tasmania's Central plateau, averages a height of about 1000 metres. During the winter months it is sometimes snowed under.

Two major roads that branch from the Lake Highway are the Marlborough Highway (which connects to the A10 Lyell Highway), and Poatina Road (B51), which leaves the Lake Highway north of the Steppes and plunges steeply over the Great Western Tiers to the former hydro-electric construction village of Poatina.

See also

 Highways in Australia
 List of highways in Tasmania

References

Highways in Tasmania
Central Highlands (Tasmania)